"Fatal Illusion" is a song by American thrash metal band Megadeth. It was released as the lead single from their fifteenth studio album, Dystopia on October 1st, 2015, and as a CD release on October 9th of the same year.

Music and lyrics 
According to the bands website, "the lyrics are about a person who is a misfit in society and ends up getting taken before the judicial system…"

Performances
The song debuted live in Perth, Australia, on October 16th, 2015. Megadeth guitarists Dave Mustaine and Kiko Loureiro did a playthrough of the song for Guitar World magazine.

Critical reception
Loudwire ranked "Fatal Illusion" as the thirteenth best metal song of 2015.
The song was ranked the fourth greatest from the album by Return Of Rock.

Track listing

Tracks 2 & 3 recorded live at The Cow Palace, San Francisco, CA 12/4/1992.

Charts

Personnel 
Credits adapted from Dystopia liner notes.

Megadeth
 Dave Mustaine – lead and rhythm guitars, lead vocals
 Kiko Loureiro – lead guitars, backing vocals
 David Ellefson – bass, backing vocals
 Chris Adler – drums

Additional musicians
Chris Rodriguez  – backing vocals
Eric Darken – percussion
Blair Masters – keyboards & programming

Production and design
Produced by Dave Mustaine and Chris Rakestraw
Engineering by Chris Rakestraw
Mixed by Josh Wilbur
Pre-production by Cameron Webb
Additional production by Jeff Balding
Mastering by Ted Jensen
Brent Elliott White – cover artwork

References

2015 singles
2015 songs
Megadeth songs
Songs written by Dave Mustaine